Kelvin Peninsula is a peninsula on the shore of Lake Wakatipu in New Zealand's Otago Region. The peninsula lies between the main body of Lake Wakatipu and the lake's Frankton Arm (a short inlet into the lake's northern shore) and its outlet, the Kawarau River. The centre of Queenstown lies on the opposite shore of the Frankton Arm. The peninsula was formerly called Kelvin Heights Peninsula. The name Kelvin Heights is still used for the Queenstown suburb which sits on the peninsula.

Geography
The peninsula has two major parts, a rounded main part to the east, dominated by the  Peninsula Hill, and a smaller western extension largely occupied by Queenstown Golf Club. Peninsula Road skirts the shore of Frankton Arm at the foot of Peninsula Hill to link the peninsula with  close to Frankton, at the eastern end of the arm.

At one time there was public access to the prominent Deer Park Heights part of Peninsula Hill (which has several former film locations as well as a range of farm animals) from Peninsula Road, but this closed in 2009.

History
The original Ngāi Tahu inhabitants called the peninsula ,  the Expanse of Hakitekura. Hakitekura is the famous Kāti Māmoe woman who was the first person to swim across the lake. Several other nearby geographical features are named after Hakitekura and this historic event.

European settlers first called it the Kawarau Peninsula, before changing it to Kelvin Peninsula.

Kelvin Heights
The Queenstown suburb of Kelvin Heights sits at the narrow isthmus between the two parts of the peninsula. It is one of the most expensive suburbs in New Zealand in which to buy a house, with the median house value at about NZ$1 million in 2005. Kelvin Heights features part of the Queenstown Trail, which runs between the suburb and the Frankton Arm section of Lake Wakatipu. The suburb is also home to a Christian camp that is over 50 years old.

Demographics

Kelvin Heights had a population of 1,170 at the 2018 New Zealand census, an increase of 159 people (15.7%) since the 2013 census, and an increase of 207 people (21.5%) since the 2006 census. There were 447 households. There were 588 males and 579 females, giving a sex ratio of 1.02 males per female. The median age was 43.4 years (compared with 37.4 years nationally), with 168 people (14.4%) aged under 15 years, 204 (17.4%) aged 15 to 29, 567 (48.5%) aged 30 to 64, and 228 (19.5%) aged 65 or older.

Ethnicities were 88.2% European/Pākehā, 5.9% Māori, 1.3% Pacific peoples, 7.2% Asian, and 3.8% other ethnicities (totals add to more than 100% since people could identify with multiple ethnicities).

The proportion of people born overseas was 30.5%, compared with 27.1% nationally.

Although some people objected to giving their religion, 52.8% had no religion, 39.2% were Christian, 0.5% were Hindu, 1.5% were Buddhist and 2.3% had other religions.

Of those at least 15 years old, 288 (28.7%) people had a bachelor or higher degree, and 84 (8.4%) people had no formal qualifications. The median income was $44,800, compared with $31,800 nationally. 276 people (27.5%) earned over $70,000 compared to 17.2% nationally. The employment status of those at least 15 was that 567 (56.6%) people were employed full-time, 141 (14.1%) were part-time, and 9 (0.9%) were unemployed.

References

External links 
Lakeland Christian Camp
Queenstown Golf Course

Populated places in Otago
Suburbs of Queenstown, New Zealand
Peninsulas of Otago
Queenstown-Lakes District
Populated places on Lake Wakatipu